

Incumbents
King: Philip IV

Events
May 26 - Portuguese Restoration War: Battle of Montijo

References

 
1640s in Spain